Cartoon Network Racing is a racing video game developed by Eutechnyx for PlayStation 2 and Firebrand Games for Nintendo DS, published by Danish video game developer The Game Factory, and released on December 4, 2006, in North America, and on February 9, 2007, in Europe. The gameplay is similar to Nintendo's 2003 game Mario Kart: Double Dash, but the characters and racetracks are all from 6 of Cartoon Network's original animated television series: Courage the Cowardly Dog, Cow and Chicken, Dexter's Laboratory, I Am Weasel, Johnny Bravo, and The Powerpuff Girls.

Gameplay
There are two characters the player must choose: a driver, who drives a go-kart, and a co-driver, who uses all weapons and has two "toon powers". There are tournaments which players must race a series of races and win with the most points. Battle modes in arenas let two teams battle in different modes, and Cartoon Eliminators are endurance races where last kart in each lap is eliminated. The karts have three stats: acceleration, speed, and handling (if chosen as driver). If co-driver, they have two toon powers that fall into four categories: Shield, Attack, Boost and Flight.

All 20 characters in the DS version get their own kart (the Powerpuff Girls have separate karts, unlike the PS2 version). Each character's toon power can be used when their toon power bar is full. There are 1-8 players available in this version. Unlike the PlayStation 2 version, there are two mini-games and three cartoons.

A gallery in the PlayStation 2 version contains two cartoons from each show. The first cartoon is unlocked by completing each cartoon-themed tournament while the other is unlocked by winning the super tournament with the driver of the series the player wants to unlock.

Reception

The DS version received "mixed" reviews, while the PlayStation 2 version received "generally unfavorable reviews" according to video game review aggregator Metacritic.

Lucas M. Thomas of IGN criticized the DS version for its similarities to the Mario Kart series, especially Mario Kart DS, as well as for having no characters from other Cartoon Network shows that were airing new episodes at the time such as Ben 10, Camp Lazlo, Class of 3000, Codename: Kids Next Door, Ed, Edd n Eddy, Foster's Home for Imaginary Friends, The Grim Adventures of Billy & Mandy, Hi Hi Puffy AmiYumi, The Life and Times of Juniper Lee, My Gym Partner's a Monkey and Squirrel Boy. GameSpot's Aaron Thomas pointed out the same version's resemblance to Mario Kart, but he explained that a younger audience would find the game more enjoyable than an audience of serious gamers would.

References

External links
 

Cartoon Network video games
Crossover racing games
Kart racing video games
Nintendo DS games
PlayStation 2 games
2006 video games
Video games developed in the United Kingdom
The Game Factory games
Multiplayer and single-player video games
Firebrand Games games